The Central Election Commission, commonly abbreviated in Albanian as KQZ, is a permanent, non-independent partisan statutory agency responsible for conducting parliamentary and local elections in the Republic of Albania. The commission, which overlooks the local election commissions in the country is made up of 7 party affiliated members representing the distribution of seats in the Albanian Assembly.

Commissioners

Elections

References

Albania
Election commissions in Albania